Orville Lothrop Freeman (May 9, 1918February 20, 2003) was an American Democratic politician who served as the 29th governor of Minnesota from 1955 to 1961, and as the U.S. Secretary of Agriculture from 1961 to 1969 under Presidents John F. Kennedy and Lyndon B. Johnson. He was one of the founding members of the Minnesota Democratic-Farmer-Labor Party and strongly influential in the merger of the pre-DFL Minnesota Democratic and Farmer-Labor Parties. Freeman nominated Kennedy for president at the 1960 Democratic Party national convention.

Early life
Freeman was born on May 9, 1918, in Minneapolis, Minnesota, the son of Orville and Frances (Schroeder) Freeman. He attended Central High School in Minneapolis. In 1940, Freeman graduated Phi Beta Kappa from the University of Minnesota, where he met his lifelong friend and political ally Hubert Humphrey. He also met his wife, Jane Charlotte Shields, in college. They married on May 2, 1942, and had two children.

Military service
Figuring that the United States would eventually become involved in World War II, Freeman signed up for the Marine Reserve in 1940 with the understanding he could finish law school before he fulfilled his required service. The attack on Pearl Harbor ended that arrangement, and on December 31, 1941, he received orders to report to Officer Candidate School at Marine Corps Base Quantico.

After graduating and following training to be an infantry officer, Freeman reported to Camp Elliot, just outside San Diego, California. He was soon assigned to the 9th Marine Regiment, Kilo Company, 3rd Battalion, 9th Marines. His unit shipped out overseas for periods of training in New Zealand and Guadalcanal.

On November 1, 1943, Freeman saw his first combat when his unit came ashore at Torokina on Bougainville in what were the first battles of the Bougainville Campaign. A few days later, while he was leading a patrol, he encountered a group of five or six Japanese soldiers in a clearing. An exchange of gunfire followed, and Freeman was wounded in the jaw and left arm. He was evacuated to a US Army hospital on New Caledonia and then to a Naval hospital on Nouméa. He returned to the U.S. in 1944 but never recovered enough movement in his arm to pass a Marine Corps physical to return to combat.

Political career

Freeman earned his LL.B. from the University of Minnesota Law School in 1946. He then practiced law in Minneapolis. He ran unsuccessfully for attorney general of Minnesota in 1950 and for governor in 1952.

Freeman was elected governor in 1954 and reelected in 1956 and 1958. He took the unusual action of declaring martial law in the city of Albert Lea on December 11, 1959, to maintain law and order during a strike at the Wilson Packing Company. After 12 days, a federal court ruled that martial law was inappropriate. On November 13, 1955, Freeman was a guest on the variety show Toast of the Town, which was later called The Ed Sullivan Show.

In July 1960, Freeman nominated U.S. Senator John F. Kennedy for president at the Democratic National Convention.

Following his defeat for reelection as governor in 1960, Freeman was appointed as U.S. Secretary of Agriculture by the newly elected President Kennedy, and he was retained in that post by President Lyndon B. Johnson. He served until January 21, 1969.

Later life
Later, Freeman headed two consulting businesses and practiced law in Washington, D.C. He was president and CEO of Business International Corporation from 1970 to 1985.

Freeman died from complications of Alzheimer's disease on February 20, 2003, in Minneapolis. He was buried in that city's Lakewood Cemetery.

Legacy
Freeman is remembered for submitting proposed legislation to establish the Food Stamp Program for the poor, which is still in use today.

His son Mike Freeman ran unsuccessfully for governor in 1998 and served non-consecutive terms as County Attorney for Hennepin County, Minnesota (1991 to 1999, and 2007 to 2023).

Freeman’s name was mentioned in a 1963 episode of The Beverly Hillbillies. In the Season 2 episode “Granny’s Garden”, the main characters are about to mule-plow their estate's front lawn in order to plant a garden. The character Jane Hathaway drives up and exclaims “What in the name of Secretary Freeman are you doing?!”

Awards and decorations
Freeman's decorations and medals include:

See also

 List of notable United States Marines

Notes

References

Bibliography

Web
Minnesota Historical Society

External links

 The  personal papers of Orville Freeman are available for research use at the Minnesota Historical Society.
 Oral History Interviews with Orville Freeman, Lyndon Baines Johnson Library
 

|-

|-

1918 births
2003 deaths
American cooperative organizers
Democratic Party governors of Minnesota
United States Secretaries of Agriculture
Deaths from Alzheimer's disease
University of Minnesota alumni
University of Minnesota Law School alumni
United States Marine Corps officers
United States Marine Corps personnel of World War II
Military personnel from Minnesota
American people of Norwegian descent
American people of Swedish descent
Politicians from Minneapolis
Lyndon B. Johnson administration cabinet members
Kennedy administration cabinet members
20th-century American politicians
Burials at Lakewood Cemetery
Neurological disease deaths in Minnesota
Central High School (Minneapolis, Minnesota) alumni
United States Marine Corps reservists